Dust to Dust is the third full-length studio album by the French power metal band Heavenly. It was released on 12 January 2004 by Noise Records. Dust to Dust is a concept album following a man seeking revenge upon the Master of Doom for transforming him into a vampire and forcing him to prey on the innocent for eternity. The album concludes with the protagonist overcoming his master. He suffers a fatal wound, but he regains his soul and attains paradise.

The album's cover art was designed by Jan Meininghaus, a graphic designer from Germany.

In 2017, Loudwire ranked it as the 25th best power metal album of all time.

Track listing

Personnel 
Benjamin Sotto - vocals, keyboard
Maxence Pilo - drums
Frédéric Leclercq - guitars, backing vocals
Pierre-Emmanuel Pélisson - bass
Charley Corbiaux - guitars

References

2004 albums
Heavenly (French band) albums
Noise Records albums
Concept albums